Clarence Bell may refer to:

 Clarence Bell (Boston Legal), a character in Boston Legal
 Clarence Bell (basketball), basketball player
 Clarence D. Bell (1914–2002), member of the Pennsylvania State Senate